James, Jim, Jimmy, or Jamie Davis may refer to:

Entertainment
 J. Gunnis Davis (1873–1937), actor and director, whose directorial work was credited as James Davis
 Jim Davis (actor) (1909–1981), American actor
 Jim Davis (cartoonist) (born 1945), creator of the Garfield comic strip
 Jamie Davis (actor) (born 1981), English actor
 Jamie Davis (musician) (born 1983), American musician
 James B. Davis (musician) (1917–2007), American musician
 James "Thunderbird" Davis (1938–1992), American Texas blues and electric blues guitarist, singer and songwriter
 Jimmy Davis (songwriter) (1915–1997), co-writer of the song "Lover Man (Oh, Where Can You Be?)"
 Jimmy Davis (Memphis singer), singer-songwriter for 1980s rock band Jimmy Davis & Junction
 James Davis (critic) (1853–1907), pen-name Owen Hall, Irish-born theatre writer and theatre critic
 James Davis (satirist) (c. 1706–1755), Welsh doctor and satirist
 James G. Davis, American artist

Sports

American football
 James Davis (cornerback) (born 1957), NFL cornerback and safety
 James Davis (linebacker) (born 1979), NFL linebacker
 Jim Davis (gridiron football) (born 1981), American football player
 James Davis (running back) (born 1986), American football halfback

Baseball
 Jumbo Davis (James J. Davis, 1861–1921), American baseball player
 Jim Davis (pitcher) (1924–1995), baseball pitcher
 Jim Davis (third baseman) (fl. 1945), American baseball player

Other sports
 James Davis (Surrey cricketer) (fl. 1840s), English cricketer
 James Davis (Kent cricketer) (died 1870), English cricketer
 Jim Davis (rugby league) (1887–1934), Australian rugby league footballer of the 1900s and 1910s
 James Davis (wrestler) (1893–1???), British wrestler
 Jim Davis (basketball player) (1941–2018), American basketball player
 Jim Davis (basketball coach) (born 1946), American college basketball coach
 James Davis (sprinter) (born 1976), American sprinter
 Jimmy Davis (footballer) (1982–2003), Manchester United footballer
 James Davis (fencer) (born 1991), British fencer
 James Davis (footballer, born 1995) (born 1995), Equatoguinean footballer

Politics
 James Davis (printer) (1721–1785), first postmaster of North Carolina 
 James Davis (Australian politician) (c. 1811–1859), politician in Alberton, Victoria, Australia
 James Davis (Iowa politician) (1826–1897), Iowa state senator
 James H. Davis (congressman) (1853–1940), United States Representative from Texas
 James J. Davis (1873–1947), United States Senator from Pennsylvania and Secretary of Labor
 James C. Davis (1895–1981), United States Representative from Georgia
 Jimmie Davis (1899–2000), musician and Governor of Louisiana
 Jim Davis (Florida politician) (born 1957), United States Representative from Florida
 Jim Davis (Indiana politician) (1928–2012), Indiana state representative
 Jim Davis (North Carolina politician) (born 1947), North Carolina state senator
 James E. Davis (New York politician) (1962–2003), assassinated New York City politician
 Jim Davis (Ohio politician) (1935–2011), Republican member of the Ohio House of Representatives

Religion
 James J. Davis (bishop) (1852–1926), Roman Catholic bishop
 James Peter Davis (1904–1988), American Roman Catholic archbishop
 James Levert Davis, African Methodist Episcopal bishop

Law
 James Z. Davis (1943–2016), judge on the Utah Court of Appeals
 James Edward Davis (1817–1887), barrister, magistrate and author
 James E. Davis (Los Angeles police officer) (1889–1949), Los Angeles Chief of Police

Business
 Jim Davis (businessman) (born 1943), Chairman of New Balance Athletic Shoe, Inc. and founder of Major League Lacrosse
 James M. Davis (born 1948), former chief financial officer of Stanford Financial Group who pled guilty for his role in a US$7 billion Ponzi scheme

Other
 James Davis (VC) (1835–1893), Scottish Victoria Cross recipient
 James Davis (escaped convict) (1808–1889), aka "Duramboi", escaped convict who lived with Aborigines
 James A. Davis (1929–2016), sociologist
 James B. Davis (general) (born 1935), U.S. Air Force general
 Jim Limber Davis, mulatto boy who was briefly a ward of Jefferson Davis, president of the Confederate States of America
 James Davis (mariner) (1575–c. 1620), English ship captain and author
 James William Davis, British naturalist 
 James Davis (musical group), musical group signed to Motown

Other uses
 USS James L. Davis (1861) (1861), sailing bark acquired by the Union Navy during the American Civil War

See also 
 Jimmy Davies (disambiguation)
 James Davies (disambiguation)
 Jim Davies (disambiguation)
 Jimmy Davies, American racecar driver in Champ cars and midgets